Aliabad (also Romanized as ‘Alīābād) is a village in Mianrud Rural District, Chamestan District, Nur County, Mazandaran Province, Iran. At the 2006 census, its population was 440, in 117 families.

References 

Populated places in Nur County